World Three-cushion Billiards Championship may refer to:

Informal challenge match championships of the 19th century to early 20th century (see List of World Three-cushion Billiards Champions)
The UMB World Three-cushion Championship
Informally, the Billiards World Cup